Courts of Tennessee include:
;State courts of Tennessee
Tennessee Supreme Court
Tennessee Court of Appeals (3 grand divisions)
Tennessee Court of Criminal Appeals (3 grand divisions)
Tennessee Circuit Courts (31 judicial districts)
Tennessee Chancery and Probate Courts (31 judicial districts)
Tennessee Criminal Courts (31 judicial districts)
Tennessee Municipal and City Courts
Tennessee Juvenile and Family Courts
Tennessee General Session Courts

Federal courts located in Tennessee
United States District Court for the Eastern District of Tennessee
United States District Court for the Middle District of Tennessee
United States District Court for the Western District of Tennessee

Former federal courts of Tennessee
United States District Court for the District of Tennessee (extinct, subdivided)

References

External links
National Center for State Courts – directory of state court websites.
 

Courts in the United States